The 15th Signal Regiment (15 Sig Regt) is military communications unit of the British Army's Royal Corps of Signals.

History 

The regiment was originally formed before World War II during the expansion of British Army signals units. The unit provided communications for the island of Cyprus but was disbanded shortly after 1963. In 1992, following the Options for Change reforms, it was reformed to support HQ Northern Ireland and other units deployed during Operation Banner.

World War Period

Inter-war 
Before World War II, the Egypt Signals unit was formed. It was tasked with providing communications and signals support for British Army units based in Egypt. Their area of responsibility was not limited to Egypt itself, but included the following areas: Mandatory Palestine, Sudan, and Cyprus. During this time, the unit was collectively known as Egypt Command Signals.

World War II 
In 1940, the regiment was based in Cairo. Following Italy's entry in the war, the regiment's support ranged from providing signals and communications for units in Cyprus, Greece, Macedonia, the Balkans, and Eastern Africa.

Cyprus 
Following the end of World War Two, the regiment was re-titled in 1946 as the 3rd General Headquarters Signal Regiment. In 1959, Middle East Command was dissolved and split into two new formations, namely, British Forces Suez Canal and British Forces Arabian Peninsula. As a result, the regiment was renamed as 15th (Cyprus) Signal Regiment to better represent their new role.

Cold War 
On 15 January 1965, the regiment was reformed in Aden. After this reform, the regiment was re-titled as 15th Signal Regiment.

Post-Cold War 
The regiment was reformed for the third time at Thiepval Barracks in Lisburn, Northern Ireland in 1990 and was re-titled as 15th Signal Regiment.

After the Options for Change reforms, the regiment gained command of more signal squadrons. After the end of Operation Banner, the regiment was relocated to Blandford Forum in Dorset.

According to a FOI Response, the regiment will fall under the command of 11th Signal Brigade and Headquarters West Midlands.  By 2025, the regiment will move from its current location at Blandford Camp to Swinton Barracks in Perham Down, thereby co-locating with the remainder of the regular units of 7th Signal Group.

The regiment under the reform is to re-organise and become a close support signals unit. The regiment will support the 12th Armoured Infantry Brigade by 2020.

In 2019, the regiment moved from Blandford Camp to Swinton Barracks in Perham Down.

Current structure 
The regiment's current structure in March 2021 is as follows:

 15th Signal Regiment, at Swinton Barracks, Perham Down
 Regimental Headquarters
 207 (Jerboa) Signal Squadron
 Support Squadron

References

Sources 

 Lord, Cliff, and Graham Watson. The Royal Corps of Signals Unit Histories of the Corps (1920-2001) and Its Antecedents. Helion and Company, 2003. 
 "HQ 11th Signal and West Midlands Brigade". www.army.mod.uk. Retrieved 2019-10-20.
 "Royal Signals". www.army.mod.uk. Retrieved 2019-10-20.

Military units and formations established in 1936
Military units and formations established in 1940
Military units and formations established in 1965
Military units and formations established in 1992
Military units and formations disestablished in 1938
Military units and formations disestablished in 1963
Military units and formations disestablished in 1967
Regiments of the Royal Corps of Signals
Regiments of the British Army